Sambalpur is a city in Sambalpur district in the Indian state of Odisha. It lies at a distance of 321 km from the state capital Bhubaneswar. In the year 1876, Sambalpur was established as a municipality. It is currently the headquarters and the largest city of Sambalpur district. It is also the commercial capital of Western Odisha. Sambalpur is famous for Hirakud Dam, Sambalpuri Saree, Sambalpuri songs, Sambalpuri dance, the Sitalsasthi Carnival, The Leaning Temple of Huma and Gandhi temple.

List of educational organizations in Sambalpur

Universities and autonomous institutes
 Indian Institute of Management Sambalpur
 Odisha State Open University 
 Sambalpur University 
 Veer Surendra Sai University of Technology 
 Sambalpur University Institute of Information Technology
 Gangadhar Meher University
 Veer Surendra Sai Institute of Medical Sciences and Research

Colleges 
 Netaji Subash Chandra Bose College
Government Womens College
Lajpat Rai Law College, Sambalpur
Hirakud College, Hirakud
Orissa Medical College of Homeopathy & Research, Sambalpur
Burla College, Burla
Govt College Of Physical Education, Sambalpur
Sambalpur Nursing College, Dhanupali
Dr Parshuram Mishra Institute of Advanced Studies in Education, Sambalpur
Silicon Institute of Technology, Sambalpur

References